Vice Admiral Syed Arifullah Hussaini  (23 April 1961  December 17, 2020) also known as S.A. Hussaini, was a vice admiral in the Pakistan Navy. He also served as the Commander, Pakistan Fleet on 14 June 2016.

Biography

Hussaini was born in Karachi, Sindh in Pakistan into an Urdu-speaking family on 23 April 1961. He was educated at the Cadet College Petaro in Jamshoro and left the college to attend the Pakistan Naval Academy in Karachi. He graduated from the Naval Academy in 1981, and gained commissioned as Sub-Lieutenant.

He was further educated at the Command and Staff College in Quetta, and attained MS in War studies from the National Defence University (NDU). He also studied for the national defence course in China, and qualified for the surface warfare from the United States.

His sea command assignment included his role as commanding officer of PNS Zulfikar and PNS Tariq. In 2008, he was promoted to one-star rank, and Commodore Hussaini served as the ACNS (Plans) and ACNS (Personnel). In 2013, Rear-Admiral Hussaini was appointed Commander Coast (COMCOAST). He was promoted to three-star rank, Vice-Admiral, in 2014, and took over the command of Karachi, as COMKAR, which is the responsibility of naval establishment in Karachi.

In 2014, Vice-Admiral Hussain was in the race to be appointed as a four-star admiral and take over the command of the Navy as its Chief of Naval Staff, along with Vice-Admiral Khan Hasham bin Saddique and Vice-Admiral Z.M. Abbasi. However, the most senior admiral in the Navy, Admiral Moh'd Zakaullah was promoted to the four-star appointment,

On 3 December 2015, Vice-Admiral Hussaini was appointed as a senior fleet commander in the Pakistan Navy, taking over the command, from Vice-Admiral

He has been decorated with Hilal-e-Imtiaz (Military), Sitara-e-Imtiaz (Military) and Tamgha-e-Basalat

On 17 December 2020, he died due to COVID-19.

Awards and decorations

See also
 Pakistan Navy

References

External links
Navy website

1961 births
2020 deaths
People from Karachi
Muhajir people
Cadet College Petaro alumni
Pakistan Naval Academy alumni
Chinese–Urdu translators
National Defence University, Pakistan alumni
Pakistan Navy admirals
Recipients of Hilal-i-Imtiaz
Recipients of Sitara-i-Imtiaz
Recipients of Tamgha-e-Basalat